Tembe may refer to:
 Tembe people (Tsonga), an ethnic group of South Africa
 Tembé, an ethnic group of Brazil
 Tembé language, a language of Brazil
 Tembe River, a river in Mozambique
 Tembe Elephant Park, a nature reserve in South Africa
 Mrs Tembe, a fictional character in the Doctors TV series
 Benjamin Mokulu Tembe (born 1989), football player
 Cristina Tembe (died 2017), Mozambican independence activist and politician
 Govindrao Tembe (1881–1955), Indian musician
 Tembe Swami (1854–1914), Indian religious leader

Language and nationality disambiguation pages
Mozambican surnames